Westwood, Baillie and Co was a Victorian engineering and shipbuilding company based at London Yard in Cubitt Town, London.

The company was set up in 1856 by Robert Baillie and Joseph Westwood, previously managers of Ditchburn and Mares shipyard.

Partly as a result of a fall in demand due to the financial crisis of 1866, a period of financial stress and reorganisation resulted in Westwood and Baillie acting as managers for the London Engineering & Iron Shipbuilding Company Ltd, until they regained control in 1872.

For much of its life the company produced iron and steel work for bridges. In 1887 the company made the girders for the Lansdowne Bridge over the Indus River, then the longest rigid girder bridge in the world. Work on a more modest scale included a railway footbridge that can still be seen at Romford railway station, and the 1879 swing bridges over the Royal Albert Dock. The company also contributed towards the Attock Khurd Bridge, built in 1880, between what's now called Khyber Pukhtoonkhwa province and Pakistani Punjab. It's still in a great ship and is a major attraction for tourists and history lovers.

The company was wound up in 1893 and in 1895 Baillie was declared bankrupt. Joseph Westwood continued in business at Napier Yard as Joseph Westwood and Co. There is a large monument to him in Tower Hamlets Cemetery. The Railway footbridge at Wymondham, Norfolk was also built by the company.

London Yard was subsequently taken over by Yarrows.

Notable products
 Tug Powerful, 1857 
River Chenab Bridge Chiniot Distt Jhang Punjab Pakistan 
 Taptee Bridge (India), 1858 
 HMS Resistance, 1861.
 HMS Valiant, 1863 (completed under the ownership of Thames Ironworks) 
 Iron clipper Royal Edward, 1864 
 Tugs Robert Bruce, 1865, Scotia, 1874  and Granville, 1876 
 Jervois Swing Bridge, Port Adelaide South Australia, 1878 
 Attock Bridge (now in Pakistan) over the Indus, 1880 
 Colesberg Bridge over the Orange River (Northern Cape, South Africa), 1885 
 Barkly Bridge over the Vaal River (Northern Cape, South Africa), 1885
 Colenso Bridge over the Tugela River, Colony of Natal, South Africa, 1879
 Lansdowne Bridge (now in Pakistan) over the Indus, 1887-8 
 Motueka River (Kohatu) Bridge (Tasman District, New Zealand) 1888
 Puente ferroviario Birris over the Birris River (Paraíso Cartago, Costa Rica), 1889
 Tugs Mabel, 1890  and Donovan, 1890

External links
 Pictures of Old Attock Bridge
 Lansdowne Bridge, Sukkur
 Name plate on footbridge, Romford
 Barkly West Bridge

References

Engineering companies of the United Kingdom
Defunct shipbuilding companies of the United Kingdom
History of the London Borough of Tower Hamlets
Shipbuilding in London
Ships built in Cubitt Town
Shipyards on the River Thames
Port of London